Baptism of Fire: The Second Battle of Ypres and the Forging of Canada, April 1915 is a non-fiction book, written by Canadian writer Nathan M. Greenfield, first published in April 2007 by HarperCollins. In the book, the author recounts "The Second Battle of Ypres", called an "heroic battle" of World War I. The battle poised skilled German soldiers armed with chlorine gas against the entrenched 1st Canadian Division who managed to prevail, against odds. In defeating the Germans, and overcoming the effects of the first chemical attack of the modern era, Greenfield tells a "gripping" tale for anyone seeking to understand Canadian history or her military past.

Awards and honours
Baptism of Fire received shortlist recognition for the 2008 "Edna Staebler Award for Creative Non-Fiction".

See also
List of Edna Staebler Award recipients

References

External links
HarperCollins Canada, Nathan M. Greenfield, biography. Retrieved November 22, 2012

Canadian non-fiction books
2007 non-fiction books
HarperCollins books